Love After Midnight was a 1964 LP album by Patti Page, released by Columbia Records as catalog numbers CL 2132 (monaural) and CS 8932 (stereo). The orchestra was conducted by Robert Mersey.

It was re-released in compact disc form, combined with Patti Page's 1963 album, Say Wonderful Things, by Collectables Records, on November 25, 2003.

Track listing

Patti Page albums
1964 albums
Columbia Records albums